Beit Yanai (lit. House of Yanai) is a moshav in central Israel. Located in the Sharon plain on the shore of the Mediterranean Sea around six kilometres north of Netanya, it falls under the jurisdiction of Hefer Valley Regional Council.

History
The moshav was founded in 1933 by Jewish immigrants from Lithuania and Poland, and was named after Alexander Jannaeus (known in Hebrew as Alexander Yanai) the Hasmonean king. There were several Americans among the original settlers.

A jetty, built in 1938 for unloading cargo, is located to the north of the moshav. The Altalena was anchored there, and it was used for exporting citrus fruits.

It later absorbed more immigrants from South Africa. By 1947 it had over 100 residents.

Notable residents
Morris Kahn

References

External links

Moshavim
Agricultural Union
Populated places established in 1933
Jewish villages in Mandatory Palestine
Populated places in Central District (Israel)
1933 establishments in Mandatory Palestine
Lithuanian-Jewish culture in Israel
Polish-Jewish culture in Israel
South African-Jewish culture in Israel